Robert Brett Zatechka (born December 1, 1971) is a former American football offensive lineman in the National Football League for the New York Giants. He was born to Douglas and Jane Zatechka in 1971. He was drafted in the fourth round of the 1995 NFL Draft out of the University of Nebraska.  In college, he won both the Draddy Trophy and a Walter Byers Scholarship.  He was the first Giant draft pick to sign after the 1995 draft.

Zatechka graduated medical school in 2004, completed a residency in anesthesia at the University of Nebraska Medical Center in 2008, and is currently practicing in Omaha at OrthoNebraska.

See also
 Colin Allred - former NFL linebacker who became a lawyer and US Representative
 Tommy Casanova - former NFL player who became an ophthalmologist
 Dennis Claridge – former NFL quarterback who became an orthodontist
 Dan Doornink – former NFL running back who became a medical doctor
 Laurent Duvernay-Tardif – current NFL player who earned a medical degree while playing in the league
 John Frank - Super Bowl winning SF 49er who became a NY City based plastic surgeon
 Joel Makovicka – former NFL fullback who became a doctor of physical therapy
 Bill McColl - former NFL player who became an orthopedic surgeon, father of Milt McColl
 Milt McColl - former NFL linebacker who became a medical doctor
 Frank Ryan – former NFL player and mathematician, who maintained an academic career while playing in the league
 Myron Rolle – former NFL defensive back who was also a Rhodes scholar and is now serving a neurosurgery residency
 John Urschel – former NFL player and mathematician who was a PhD candidate while playing in the league
 Byron White - former NFL running back who became a US Supreme Court Justice

References

1971 births
Living people
American football offensive guards
Nebraska Cornhuskers football players
New York Giants players
William V. Campbell Trophy winners
University of Nebraska Medical Center alumni
Sportspeople from Lansing, Michigan
Players of American football from Michigan
Physicians from Nebraska